Sonnenallee is a railway station in the Neukölln district of Berlin.

Notable places nearby
Estrel Hotel

References

Sonnenallee
Sonnenallee
Railway stations in Germany opened in 1912